The mayor of London is head of London City Council. The 65th and current mayor of the city is Josh Morgan. London was incorporated as a town in 1848, and became a city in 1855. Originally, mayors were elected on January 1 for one-year terms.

The following is a list of mayors of London:

Chain of office
Since 1957, each sitting mayor has been honoured and presented with the chain of office to wear during their term of office.  The chain of office is to be worn by the mayor during council sessions and other official occasions, including opening and closing ceremonies such as London's hosting of national and international sports and athletic competitions. The chain contains medallions engraved with subjects of local significance. The chain is also engraved with the names of the mayors who have worn it since it was commissioned.  There are currently eleven names of previous mayors engraved on the chain.

Town of London
Simeon Morrill (1848)
Thomas C. Dixon (1849)
Simeon Morrill (1850–1851)
Edward Adams (1852–1853)
Marcus Holmes (1854)

City of London
Murray Anderson (1855)
William Barker (1856)
Elijah Leonard, Jr. (1857)
David Glass (1858)
William McBride (1859)
James Moffatt (1860)
Francis Evans Cornish (1861–1864)
David Glass (1865–1866)
Frank Smith (1867)
William Simpson Smith (1868)
John Christie (1869)
Simpson Hackett Graydon (1869–1870)
James Mitchell Cousins (1871)
John Campbell (1872)
Andrew McCormick (1873)
Benjamin Cronyn, Jr. (1874–1875) - (b. 1840 to Bishop Benjamin Cronyn) fled Canada for Vermont due to fraud and died 1905; he is related to actor Hume Cronyn
Duncan Cameron Macdonald (1876)
Robert Pritchard (1877)
Robert Lewis (1878–1879)
John Campbell (1880–1881)
Edmund Meredith (1882–1883)
Charles Smith Hyman (1884)
Henry Becher (1885)
Thomas Daniel Hodgens (1886)
James Cowan (1887–1888)
George Taylor (1889–1891)
William Melville Spencer (1892)
Emanuel Thomas Essery (1893–1894)
John William Little (1895–1897)
John Dolway Wilson (1898–1899)
Frederick George Rumball (1900–1901)
Adam Beck (1902–1904)
Clarence Thomas Campbell (1905)
Joseph Coulson Judd (1906–1907)
Samuel Stevely (1908–1909)
John Henry Alfred Beattie (1910–1911)
Charles Milton Richardson Graham (1912–1914)
Hugh Allan Stevenson (1915)
William Moir Gartshore (1916)
Hugh Allan Stevenson (1916–1917)
Charles Ross Somerville (1918–1919)
Edgar Sydney Little (1920–1921)
John Cameron Wilson (1921–1922)
George Albert Wenige (1923–1925)
John Mackenzie Moore (1926–1927)
George Albert Wenige (1928)
William John Kirkpatrick (1929–1930)
Edwy George Hayman (1931–1932)
Ferrier Baker Kilbourne (1933)
George Albert Wenige (1934–1935)
Thomas Kingsmill (1936–1938)
Joseph Allan Johnston (1939–1940)
William J. Heaman (1941–1945)
Frederick George McAlister (1946)
George Albert Wenige (1947–1948)
Ray Ameredith Dennis (1949)
George Albert Wenige (1950)
Allan Johnson Rush (1951–1955)
George Ernest Beedle (1955)
Ray Ameredith Dennis (1955–1957)
Joseph Allan Johnston (1958–1960)
Gordon Stronach (1961–1968)
Herbert Joseph McClure (1968–1971)
James Frederick Gosnell (1972)
Jane Elizabeth Bigelow (1972–1978)
Martin Alphonse Gleeson (1979–1985)
Thomas Charles Gosnell (1986–1994)
Dianne Haskett (1995–2000)
Anne Marie DeCicco-Best (2000–2010)
Joe Fontana (2010–2014)
Joni Baechler (June 25, 2014 – November 30, 2014)
Matt Brown (December 1, 2014 – November 30, 2018)
Ed Holder (December 1, 2018 – November 14, 2022)
Josh Morgan (November 15, 2022 - present)

2017 reform
In spite of some controversy about this move, London was the first city in Canada (in May 2017) to decide to move a ranked choice ballot for municipal elections starting in 2018. Voters will mark their ballots in order of preference, ranking their top three favourite candidates. An individual must reach 50 per cent of the total to be declared elected; in each round of counting where a candidate has not yet reached that target, the person with the fewest votes is dropped from the ballot and their second or third choice preferences reallocated to the remaining candidates, with this process repeating until a candidate has reached 50 per cent.

Sources
Frederick H. Armstrong and John H. Lutman, The Forest City: An Illustrated History of London, Canada. Burlington, Ontario: Windsor Publications, 1986.
Orlo Miller, London 200: An Illustrated History. London: London Chamber of Commerce, 1992.

References

External links
Office of the Mayor of London, Ontario

London, Ontario